Standard Deviations is a  CD released by the Fullerton College Jazz Band in 2003; three of the school's groups are on the CD to include the #1 big band and two combos.

Background 
In 1982 the Music Department at Fullerton College starting regularly recording their jazz groups which was to serve as a teaching tool for both student music groups  and students wanting to be involved with real hands on recording culminating in a marketable product.  By 2003, when the CD Standard Deviations was produced, there has been several award-winning recordings such as Time Tripping coming from the Fullerton College Jazz Band. The group has been the recipient of numerous Down Beat and NARAS awards and the CDs are distributed worldwide

Track listing

Recording Sessions 
 Recorded at Studio City Sound, July 2003

Personnel

Musicians 
Conductors: Greg Woll and Bruce Babad
Violin: Tyler Emerson
Saxes and woodwinds: Steve Tite, Christian Hernandez, Erick MacIntyre, Kevin Oess, Collin Watson
Trumpets and flugelhorns: Joe Harris, Anthony Kronfle, Juan Hidalgo, Devin Bohart, Monika Mott
Trombones: Jon Goldman, Jason Pier, Gabrial Montez, Nick Barbano
Guitar: Dom White
Piano: Emily Nafius, Dan Davis, Richard Stuart
Bass: Sean Barnett, Sean Emch
Drums: Michael Agorrilla
Percussion: Juan Pablo Castillo, Francisco Jose Crow

Production 
Recording and Mixing engineer: Tom Weir
Mastering: Lou Hemsey
Album design: Katie Muller and LMP

References

External links

 Official website

2003 albums
Fullerton College Jazz Band albums